The men's artistic individual all-around competition at the 2016 Summer Olympics was held on 6 and 10 August 2016 at the HSBC Arena. Kōhei Uchimura won gold, becoming the first male gymnast in 44 years (and third overall) to do this in two successive Olympic Games. Uchimura also became the second man to earn three all-around medals, matching countryman Sawao Kato with two golds and one silver. Uchimura's victory was Japan's sixth in the men's all-around, tying the Soviet Union for most all-time. His margin of victory was only 0.099, which was less than one small step on landing in terms of gymnastic scoring. It was also his eighth consecutive victory at the top competition of the year (World Championships and Olympics from 2009 to 2016). Oleg Vernyayev's silver was Ukraine's first medal in the event since 2000. Max Whitlock's bronze was Great Britain's first since the 1908 Games in London.

The medals were presented by Princess Nora of Liechtenstein, IOC Member from Liechtenstein, accompanied by Vasily Titov, FIG Executive Committee member.

Background

This was the 27th appearance of the men's individual all-around. The first individual all-around competition had been held in 1900, after the 1896 competitions featured only individual apparatus events. A men's individual all-around has been held every Games since 1900.

Five of the top 10 gymnasts from the 2012 Games returned. Gold medalist Kōhei Uchimura of Japan, silver medalist Marcel Nguyen of Germany, 4th place finisher Nikolai Kuksenkov of Ukraine (now competing for Russia), 5th place finisher David Belyavskiy of Russia, and 10th place finisher Sergio Sasaki of Brazil. Uchimura was favored and had been dominant for the last two Olympic cycles. He had followed the silver all-around medal in 2008 with three World Championships (2009–2011), Olympic gold in 2012, and then three more World Championships (2013–2015).

Cyprus and Lithuania each made their debut in the event. France made its 25th appearance, most among nations.

Qualification

Qualification for the men's artistic gymnastics in 2016 was based primarily on the 2015 World Artistic Gymnastics Championships. The top 8 teams at the world championships could send a full team of 5 gymnasts to the Olympics. The next 8 teams (#9 through #16) competed in the 2012 Gymnastics Olympic Test Event, with the top 4 of those teams also qualifying a team of 5 gymnasts for the Olympics. The individual apparatus medalists from the World Championships also qualified, if their nation had not already qualified a team. There were places reserved for host country and continental representation, and the Tripartite Commission made an invitation. The quota of 98 gymnasts was then filled through the individual all-around rankings at the Test Event, with each nation able to qualify only one gymnast in that manner (though this one gymnast could be added to the world championship apparatus medalists—e.g., Romania qualified Marian Drăgulescu as silver medalist in the vault and Andrei Muntean through the Test Event).

Only gymnasts competing in all six apparatus exercises in the qualifying round were ranked for the individual all-around qualifying.

Competition format
The top 24 qualifiers in the qualification phase (limit two per NOC), based on combined score of each apparatus, advanced to the individual all-around final. The finalists will perform on each apparatus again, and scores in qualification do not count anymore. Scoring was according to the Code of Points.

Schedule

All times are local (UTC−3)

Results

Qualifying

The gymnasts who ranked top twenty four qualified for final round. In case of there were more than two gymnasts in same NOC, the last ranked among them would not qualify to final round. The next best ranked gymnast would qualify instead.

Final

Both Georgiou and Larduet were forced to retire from the competition due to injury.

References

 

Men's artistic individual all-around
2016
Olympics
Men's events at the 2016 Summer Olympics